Aaron Kaufman (born 1974) is an American film producer and director. He is the former producing partner of Robert Rodriguez, having worked with him at the Troublemaker Studios. Kaufman produced films that Rodriguez also directed including Machete (2010) and Machete Kills (2013), as well Sin City: A Dame to Kill For (2014), the sequel to 2005 film Sin City. Kaufman served as executive producer for the dramas The Greatest and Powder Blue, as well the romantic comedy Spread (all 2009), the crime thriller 13 (2010), and the comedies Chef (2014) and Flock of Dudes (2016).
 
Kaufman made his directorial debut with the drug thriller Urge (2016), and more recently, he produced and directed the documentary Crusaders: Ex Jehovah's Witnesses Speak Out (2021).

Early life 
Kaufman was born in Long Island, New York. Although his uncle, Peter, who worked as a doorman, was a big cinephile and made him fall in love with the movies, Kaufman decided to pursue a career in entertainment at the age of 14, after he saw Spike Lee's Do the Right Thing: "It was like nothing i'd ever seen - the energy, the audience reaction. I was hooked". Kaufman attended the New York University for film studies against his father's wishes, who did not want to follow this path. Robert Rodriguez's book Rebel Without a Crew (1995), was a real inspiration for Kaufman and made him understand the filmmaking process.
  
Besides Rodriguez, some of the filmmakers he cites as early influences include Quentin Tarantino, Sidney Lumet, Aki Kaurismäki, Wong Kar-wai and Lars von Trier.

Career 
At the age of 24, Kaufman opened a small animation company, Fountainhead Studios, in Long Island, which he sold it when he was 25. Soon after, he began to work for Chris Blackwell's Palm Pictures. In the early 2000s, Kaufman founded the production company Barbarian Films, serving as executive producer for two films which premiered at the 2009 Sundance Film Festival: The Greatest, a drama directed by Shana Feste starring Pierce Brosnan and Susan Sarandon, and Spread, a romantic comedy directed by David Mackenzie, starring Ashton Kutcher and Anne Heche. Also that year, Kaufman executive produced Powder Blue (2009), an ensemble drama featuring Jessica Biel, Forest Whitaker, Ray Liotta and Patrick Swayze, which was released straight-to-DVD.
  
Through an agent, Kaufman met filmmaker Robert Rodriguez. He worked with Rodriguez for 6 years at Troublemaker Studios and Quick Draw Productions, developing and producing feature films. Kaufman produced films that Rodriguez directed, including the exploitation action film Machete (2010) and its sequel Machete Kills (2013), both starring Danny Trejo as the title character, as well the neo-noir crime film Sin City: A Dame to Kill For (2014), the sequel to the 2005 film Sin City.

Meanwhile, Kaufman executive produced other feature films like Géla Babluani's crime thriller 13 (2010), a remake of the 2005 Georgian-French film 13 Tzameti, starring Sam Riley, Ray Winstone, 50 Cent, Mickey Rourke and Jason Statham, as well Jon Favreau's comedy-drama Chef (2014). He served as producer for Flock of Dudes (2016), a comedy directed by Bob Castrone.
        
After his collaboration with Robert Rodriguez came to an end, Kaufman ventured into directing, his long-time passion, although he has nothing but great memories from his time as producer: "I loved it. But being a producer is like dating a girl you really like, but always dropping her off at someone else's house at the end of the night. Directors get to do the fun stuff ". Kaufman made his feature directorial debut with the drug thriller Urge (2016), starring Justin Chatwin, Ashley Greene, Danny Masterson and Pierce Brosnan, about a group of friends who experiment with a new drug that removes your inhibitions. Released in the summer by Lionsgate Premiere, it received negative reviews from critics; in her 1-star review, Christy Lemire of RogerEbert.com called Urge "a movie that’s as empty and unlikable as the characters themselves".

Kaufman produced and directed the documentary Crusaders: Ex Jehovah's Witnesses Speak Out (2021), which brings to attention several cases of child sexual abuse and pedophilia discovered within the Jehovah's Witness organization. It premiered on Vice TV on July 28.
  
Kaufman is set to direct the upcoming documentary Stealing Don Ho, about the late Hawaiian singer Don Ho.

Personal life 
Kaufman married at the age of 21, and had his first child one year later. He was raised a Jehovah's Witness, but no longer practices the faith.

Filmography

As producer

As director

References

External links 

Living people
1974 births
American film producers
Film directors from New York (state)
Film producers from New York (state)